Smash Palace is the first extended play by New Zealand singer and songwriter Sharon O'Neill. The EP is a soundtrack to the 1982 Roger Donaldson film, Smash Palace.

This vinyl only EP has become a very sought after item by collectors of her music.

The recording won "Best Film Soundtrack/Cast Recording/Compilation" at the 1983 New Zealand Music Awards.

Track listing

References 

1982 debut EPs
1982 soundtrack albums
Synth-pop EPs
Sharon O'Neill albums
CBS Records albums